Studio 57 (also known as Heinz Studio 57) is an American anthology series that was broadcast on the now-defunct DuMont Television Network from September 1954 to July 1955, and in syndication from 1955 to 1958.

"It's a Small World", the pilot episode of the series Leave It to Beaver, was broadcast on the show on April 23, 1957.

Overview
The program was a filmed anthology television series sponsored by Heinz 57 and produced by Revue Studios.  The program aired on the DuMont network from September 21, 1954, to July 26, 1955, making it "one of the last regularly-scheduled series ever carried on the crumbling DuMont network". (Only What's the Story and boxing matches aired on DuMont afterwards). Studio 57 aired in first-run syndication from September 1955 to 1958.

The series was exported to Australia during the late 1950s under the title Whitehall Playhouse.  Since some of the episodes shown there were DuMont-aired episodes, this makes Studio 57 the only DuMont show to be broadcast outside of North America. The series began airing in Australia in late 1956, during the first few months of television in that country, continuing for several years, and eventually including episodes of other American anthology series such as The Star and the Story.

Writers whose work was featured on the program included Ray Bradbury.

Episodes included "The Finishers" (January 29, 1956), with Peter Lorre, Carmen Mathews, and Gordon Mills.

Cast
The series featured many established actors, including Carolyn Jones, Hugh O'Brian, Keye Luke, Natalie Wood, Craig Stevens, Marguerite Chapman, Jean-Pierre Aumont, Brian Keith, Rod Taylor, K. T. Stevens, Hugh Beaumont, Peter Graves, Robert Armstrong, Jean Byron, Lon Chaney Jr., Andy Clyde, Charles Coburn, Olive Sturgess, Peter Lawford, Mike Connors, Jane Darwell, Joanne Dru, Vivi Janiss, Keenan Wynn, and DeForest Kelley.

Criticism
Television historians Tim Brooks and Earle Marsh describe the scripts for Studio 57 as bland.  Ailing DuMont lacked the budgets of CBS or NBC, and hence relied on cost-cutting measures, including hiring then-unknown actors to star in their series such as Hugh O'Brian and Natalie Wood.

See also
List of programs broadcast by the DuMont Television Network
List of surviving DuMont Television Network broadcasts

References

Bibliography
David Weinstein, The Forgotten Network: DuMont and the Birth of American Television (Philadelphia: Temple University Press, 2004) 
Alex McNeil, Total Television, Fourth edition (New York: Penguin Books, 1980) 
Tim Brooks and Earle Marsh, The Complete Directory to Prime Time Network TV Shows, Third edition (New York: Ballantine Books, 1964)

External links
 
DuMont historical website
Studio 57 at CVTA with episode list

1954 American television series debuts
1958 American television series endings
1950s American anthology television series
1950s American drama television series
Black-and-white American television shows
DuMont Television Network original programming
English-language television shows
First-run syndicated television programs in the United States